AEW All Out is a professional wrestling pay-per-view (PPV) event produced by All Elite Wrestling (AEW). Established in 2019, it is held annually during Labor Day weekend. The inaugural event was a spiritual successor to the September 2018 independently produced All In PPV, which served as a catalyst to the formation of AEW in January 2019. It is considered one of the "Big Four" PPVs for AEW, along with Double or Nothing, Full Gear, and Revolution, the company's four biggest shows produced quarterly.

With the exception of the 2020 event, All Out is held annually during Labor Day weekend at the Now Arena (formerly Sears Centre Arena) in the Chicago suburb of Hoffman Estates, Illinois, the same venue that hosted All In. Due to the COVID-19 pandemic in 2020, that year's All Out, which was originally scheduled for the Now Arena, had to be held at Daily's Place in Jacksonville, Florida, and it was AEW's first PPV to have a live ticketed audience (with a maximum 15% capacity of venue) after Florida loosened its COVID-19 protocols. The following year in July, AEW returned to live touring and the 2021 event became AEW's first PPV held outside of Florida since the start of the pandemic.

History
On September 1, 2018, an independent wrestling pay-per-view (PPV) event was held called All In, which took place in the Chicago suburb of Hoffman Estates, Illinois at the Sears Centre Arena—renamed to Now Arena in 2020. The event was a catalyst to the formation of All Elite Wrestling (AEW) on January 1, 2019. The new promotion would schedule a spiritual successor to All In called All Out, with the inaugural All Out PPV taking place on August 31, 2019, at the same venue as All In.

A second All Out was then held on September 5, 2020, establishing the event as an annual Labor Day weekend PPV for the promotion—this second event was originally to be held at the same venue, but was instead held at AEW's home base of Daily's Place in Jacksonville, Florida, due to the COVID-19 pandemic that began in mid-March that year. In August 2020, AEW began admitting a very limited number of fans to events, thus the 2020 event was AEW's first PPV to have live ticketed fans during the pandemic, though only at 15% of the venue's capacity. AEW resumed live touring in July 2021 and the 2021 event was held on September 5, returning to the inaugural event's venue, thus marking AEW's first PPV to be held outside of Daily's Place since the COVID-19 pandemic began.

Although Double or Nothing is considered AEW's marquee event, AEW referee Aubrey Edwards referred to All Out as AEW's premier event on an episode of the AEW Unrestricted podcast. AEW President and Chief Executive Officer Tony Khan later referred to All Out as being one of the promotion's "Big Four" PPVs, their four biggest shows of the year produced quarterly, along with Double or Nothing, Full Gear, and Revolution.

Events

See also 
List of AEW pay-per-view events

References

External links 
All Elite Wrestling Official website

 
Recurring events established in 2019